Saint Anastasius the Fuller (died 304) is a Christian saint of the pre-schism Christian Church.  Anastasius was a fuller of Aquileia who subsequently moved his business to Salona, although other sources say he went to Spalatum.

He was martyred by being drowned after he had proclaimed his Christian faith openly by painting a cross on his door.

Anastasius is the patron saint of fullers and weavers and his feast day is September 7 (formerly August 26).

References

External links
Saints of September 7: Anastasius the Fuller 

Illyrian people
Italian Roman Catholic saints
4th-century Christian saints
304 deaths